Domino Man is an arcade game released by Bally Midway in 1983. The player controls Domino Man, a bespectacled, balding man wearing a beat-up turtleneck sweater and sporting a mustache who attempts to set up a number of giant dominoes across the screen. The background music is "Maple Leaf Rag" by Scott Joplin.

Gameplay 
The goal of Domino Man is to set up a domino on every site marked by a black dot. Meanwhile, pedestrians meander throughout the playfield and may wander into dominos, knocking them over. Domino Man can shove them away from the dominos. A killer bee constantly appears trying to sting Domino Man. There is also a neighborhood bully who is much larger than Domino Man (who can be stunned but not shoved) and an invincible walking clock. Domino Man can set up dominos, swing a domino as a weapon, and remove placed dominos (which can be used to stop a cascade of falling dominos). A Domino Man is lost if he is stung or the leftmost domino is disturbed.

After the player has set up all the dominoes, they will have a choice to either knock down all the dominoes or continue play in hopes of increasing the domino bonus value. After they have made the choice, they will move on to the next screen.

When the game is over, a poem is displayed to evaluate the player's performance. For example:

Roses are red
Or so goes the verse,
You set up 52—
You could have done worse.

The main character in this game is very similar (if not the same) as the bartender in Tapper and one of the Timber lumberjacks.

External links
 

1983 video games
Action video games
Arcade video games
Arcade-only video games
Midway video games
Video games developed in the United States
Multiplayer and single-player video games

zh:骨牌人